The 1960–61 Coppa Italia was the 14th Coppa Italia, the major Italian domestic cup. The competition was won by Fiorentina.

First round 
Serie B teams.

Second round 
14 clubs from Serie A are added.

Round of 16 
Juventus, Fiorentina, Torino, Lazio are added.

Quarter-finals

Semi-finals

Third place match

Final

Top goalscorers

References

rsssf.com

Coppa Italia seasons
1960–61 domestic association football cups
Copa